Ryu Seung-soo (born August 12, 1971) is a South Korean actor. Ryu made his acting debut in 1997 with a minor role in Park Chan-wook's film Trio, and has been active as a supporting actor on film and television since. Among his notable films are the monks-versus-gangsters comedy Hi! Dharma! (2001), "kimchi" western The Good, the Bad, the Weird (2008), and Korean War movie The Front Line (2011). He also appeared on TV in the quirky series Evasive Inquiry Agency (also known as Four Gold Chasers, 2007), revenge drama The Chaser (2012), and power-struggle saga Empire of Gold (2013).

Despite being one of his earliest projects, the 2002 melodrama Winter Sonata is among Ryu's better known roles outside Korea, given the series' popularity throughout Asia. In 2009, he reprised his character via voice acting in the animated adaptation Winter Sonata Anime. 
 
Ryu wrote his memoir Don't Be an Actor Like Me, which was published in 2009.

Filmography

Film
Men of Plastic (2022) 
6/45 (2022) 
Hard Hit (2021)
Black Money (2019) (cameo)
Deep (2018) 
The Winter of the Year was Warm (2012) 
Doomsday Book (2012) 
The Front Line (2011)
Battlefield Heroes (2011) 
Finding Mr. Destiny (2010) 
Second Half (2010) 
The Good, the Bad, the Weird (2008)- Man-gil
My New Partner (2008) 
Forever the Moment (2008) (cameo)
Happiness (2007) 
Meet Mr. Daddy (2007) 
200 Pounds Beauty (2006) (cameo)
All for Love (2005) (cameo)
You Are My Sunshine (2005) 
April Snow (2005)
Mr. Gam's Victory (2004) 
The President's Barber (2004) 
If You Were Me (2003)
Once Upon a Time in a Battlefield (2003) 
Oh! Brothers (2003) 
Double Agent (2003)
Conduct Zero (2002)
Surprise Party (2002)
Hi! Dharma! (2001) 
Say Yes (2001)
A Growing Business (1999)
Art Museum by the Zoo (1998)
Rub Love (1998)
Trio (1997)

Television series
Bloody Heart (2022) 
Backstreet Rookie (2020) (special appearance)
Tell Me What You Saw (2020)
Forest (2020)
Secret Boutique (2019)
Level Up (2019)
Like a Dog, Like a Beggar, Beautiful
Top Star U-back (2018)
Wok of Love (2018)
 The Package (2017)
 Temperature of Love (2017)
 School of Magic (2017)
The Lady in Dignity (2017) (cameo)
 Distorted (2017)
Beautiful Mind (2016)
Uncontrollably Fond (2016) (cameo)
My Beautiful Bride (2015)
Shine or Go Crazy (2015)
Punch (2014) (cameo)
Wonderful Days (2014)
Empire of Gold (2013)
Drama Special "Sirius" (2013) 
Mom Is Acting Up (2012)
The Chaser (2012)
Just You  (2011)
Deep Rooted Tree (SBS, 2011)
Drama Special "Princess Hwapyung's Weight Loss" (2011) 
Lie to Me (2011) 
Winter Sonata Anime (2009)
High Kick Through the Roof (2009) (cameo, ep 26)
General Hospital 2 (2008)
Evasive Inquiry Agency  (2007)
Several Questions That Make Us Happy (2007)
Thank You (2007) 
Cute or Crazy (2005)
Old Miss Diary (2004) (cameo, ep 22-24)
MBC Best Theater "내가 사랑하는 너" ( 2003)
Sang Doo! Let's Go to School (2003)
Scent of a Man (2003)
Sundeok (2003)
Winter Sonata (2002)

Variety show
Brave Detectives 2 (2022) - Special MC   
Law of the Jungle in Yap Islands (2015)

Book
Don't Be an Actor Like Me (나 같은 배우 되지 마; 2009)

Awards
2014 3rd APAN Star Awards: Best Supporting Actor (Wonderful Days)

References

External links
Ryu Seung-soo at SidusHQ

1971 births
Living people
Male actors from Busan
South Korean male film actors
South Korean male television actors
IHQ (company) artists